Norwich City Saxons are a rugby league team based in Norwich, Norfolk. They play in the Eastern Division of the Rugby League Conference.

History
Norwich City RLFC was formed on 18 March 2008. In the club’s first season in the London League they managed to make it to 3rd place and gained a play-off berth, where the team narrowly lost to Kent Ravens.

Norwich Saxons competed in the 2009 RLC Eastern Division. They withdrew from the 2011 RLC East mid-season but are due to join the Eastern Merit League in 2012.

External links
 Official website

Rugby League Conference teams
Sport in Norwich
Rugby clubs established in 2008
Rugby league teams in Norfolk